George Haddad may refer to:

 George Wayne Haddad (1912–?), political figure in British Columbia
 George Ibrahim Haddad, Jordanian writer, poet and journalist